Ramón Salas López (born 21 August 1959) is a Mexican politician affiliated with the Institutional Revolutionary Party. He served as Deputy of the LX Legislature of the Mexican Congress representing Nuevo León, as well as a local deputy in the LXIX Legislature of the Congress of Nuevo León. He also served two terms as municipal president of Doctor Arroyo, Nuevo León from 1992 to 1994 and from 2003 to 2006.

References

1959 births
Living people
Politicians from Nuevo León
Institutional Revolutionary Party politicians
21st-century Mexican politicians
Members of the Congress of Nuevo León
20th-century Mexican politicians
Municipal presidents in Nuevo León
Deputies of the LX Legislature of Mexico
Members of the Chamber of Deputies (Mexico) for Nuevo León